Kurt Erik Gustaf Svanberg (26 September 1913 – 7 October 2001) was a Swedish ice hockey player. He competed in the men's tournament at the 1948 Winter Olympics.

References

1913 births
2001 deaths
Ice hockey players at the 1948 Winter Olympics
Olympic ice hockey players of Sweden
Ice hockey people from Stockholm
Swedish ice hockey players